Handcuffs are restraint devices.

Handcuff or Handcuffs may also refer to:
Plastic handcuffs, a restraint made with plastic straps
Handcuff cover, a piece of metal that can be placed around the handcuffs
Handcuffs (film), a 1969 film by Krsto Papić
"Handcuffs" (Togetherness), a 2015 episode from this television series
Handcuff knot, a knot having two loops

See also